The Goathaunt Bunkhouse was built as a service structure by the Glacier Park Hotel Company for the development of the Goathaunt site in Glacier National Park. This was part of the Great Northern Railway's broader development of the park as a tourist destination. The bunkhouse is the last surviving structure of this era at this location, near the southern end of Waterton Lake. Its design has been attributed to National Park Service landscape architect Thomas Chalmers Vint.

The site is at the southern end of Waterton Lake, near the modern Goat Haunt Ranger Station. It was built to house the crew of the M.V. International, a small passenger launch that plied the route between the American and Canadian ends of Waterton Lake.

References

Residential buildings on the National Register of Historic Places in Montana
Residential buildings completed in 1930
National Register of Historic Places in Glacier County, Montana
1930 establishments in Montana
National Register of Historic Places in Glacier National Park
Great Northern Railway (U.S.)